Grabois is a surname.

Notable people with this surname include:
 Aryeh Grabois (1930-2008), Israeli historian
 Daniel Grabois, American musician
 , Argentine social leader and activist
 Maurício Grabois (1912-1973), Brazilian politician
 Neil R. Grabois (born 1935), American mathematician
 Stuart GraBois, retired American prosecuting attorney